Levi Hubbard (December 19, 1762 – February 18, 1836) was a U.S. Representative from Massachusetts.  Born in Worcester in the Province of Massachusetts Bay to Jonas Hubbard and Mary (Stevens) Hubbard, he attended the common schools.  He moved to Paris in Massachusetts' District of Maine in 1785, where he farmed and served in local offices including selectman and treasurer of Oxford County.

He was prominent in the Massachusetts militia, attained the rank of major general as commander of the 13th Division, and served in the War of 1812.  He also served as member of the Massachusetts House of Representatives (1804, 1805, 1812) and the Massachusetts State Senate (1806-1811).

Hubbard was elected as a Democratic-Republican to the Thirteenth Congress (March 4, 1813 – March 3, 1815).  After leaving the House, he resumed farming, served in the Massachusetts Senate in 1816, and served as a member of the Executive Council of Maine in 1829.

Hubbard died in Paris, Maine on February 18, 1836.  He was interred in a tomb on his farm, and later re-interred at Hillside Cemetery in Paris.

Levi Hubbard is a descendant of Edmund Rice an early immigrant to Massachusetts Bay Colony as follows:

 Levi Hubbard, son of
 Jonas Hubbard (May 21, 1739 - ?), son of
 Cornet Daniel Hubbard (20 Nov 1694 - April 28, 1784), son of
 Hannah Rice (1658 - April 9, 1747), daughter of
 Samuel Rice (12 Nov 1634 - 25 Feb 1684), son of
 Edmund Rice (1594 - 3 May 1663)

References

Sources

1762 births
1836 deaths
Members of the Massachusetts House of Representatives
Massachusetts state senators
People from Paris, Maine
Politicians from Worcester, Massachusetts
Massachusetts Democratic-Republicans
Members of the Executive Council of Maine
Democratic-Republican Party members of the United States House of Representatives from the District of Maine
Members of the United States House of Representatives from Massachusetts